dCMP kinase may refer to:
 (d)CMP kinase, an enzyme 
 Cytidylate kinase, an enzyme